Heinrich Hans Schlimarski (born 5 October 1859 in Olomouc; died 13 July 1913 in Hainburg) was a Czech portrait, genre and history painter and pastellist.

Biography 
He was born in Olomouc on 5 October 1859 and gifted with natural talent. He moved with the family to the capital of the Austro-Hungarian Empire  at an early age. He studied  at the Academy of Fine Arts Vienna  with August Eisenmenger (1830 – 1907), who was an Austrian history and portrait painter in the era of the Ringstrasse and Wilhelminian style, and Hans Makart (1840 – 1884), who was the most famous Austrian academic history and portrait painter of that period. Heinrich Hans Schlimarski was considered the most gifted student of Makart and became his collaborator, together they signed many large-format works. He went on study trips to Munich and Italy and on his return he lived mainly in Vienna working for the Viennese high society as a portrait, genre and history painter. A substantial part of its production is made up of female portraits, nudes, large decoration works and oriental subjects. Many of his works became so famous that they were reproduced in prints, illustrated books and postcards. He died in mysterious circumstances; on 13 July 1913 his lifeless body was recovered from the Danube.

Artwork 
His style was influenced by Makart and is based  on an exuberant use of colors,  intense sensuality as in  Eugène Delacroix. The results are  dynamic and voluptuous forms full of energy as in the best works of Peter Paul Rubens where the fast and dense application of colours enchanted the fine and almost  transparent skin of the sitters. His artistic production, as that of his master Makart, were soon forgotten in favor of the avant-gardes, only  in the last decades of the twentieth century  their productions of absolute quality have been rediscovered and placed among the great art of the second half of the nineteenth century.

Works 
 “In the harem”, oil on canvas, 1880, signed by Makart and Schlimarski
 “The New Odalisque”, oil on canvas, 1900 - 1905
 “Leda and the Swan”, oil on canvas, 1900 - 1905
 “The Spring Nymph”, oil on canvas, 1905 - 1908
 “Aphrodite”, oil on canvas, 1906 - 1908 
 “Kokett”, oil on wood, 1908 - 1910
 “Ophelia”, oil on panel, 1910 
 “Love and Psyche”, pastel on card, 1890 – 1900
 “Profile of Girl with Gloriole”, oil on panel, 1900 - 1905 
 “An eastern dancer”, Oil on canvas, 1895 - 1900

External links

References 

1859 births
1913 deaths
19th-century Czech painters
19th-century German male artists
19th-century painters of historical subjects
Austrian male painters
Academic art
Munich School
Orientalist painters
Artists from Olomouc